Haibatpur is a large village of Yadavs in Delhi and comes under Najafgarh. It is an urbanized village.

See also
 Najafgarh

References

Villages in South West Delhi district